Ornithinibacillus heyuanensis is a Gram-positive, rod-shaped, spore-forming, hemolytic and motile bacterium from the genus of Ornithinibacillus.

References

Bacillaceae
Bacteria described in 2014